The 2022 Rice Owls football team represented Rice University as a member of Conference USA (C-USA) during the 2022 NCAA Division I FBS football season. They were led by head coach Mike Bloomgren, who was coaching his fifth season with the team. The Owls played their home games at the Rice Stadium in Houston, Texas.

In October 2021, Rice accepted the invitation to join the American Athletic Conference (AAC), scheduled to become a full-member on July 1, 2023. The 2022 season was expected to be the program's last season as a member of Conference USA.

The Owls finished their regular season with a 5–7 record, and became bowl eligible due to having the highest APR among FBS teams with 5–7 records.

Preseason

C-USA media day
The Conference USA media day was held on July 27 at Globe Life Field in Arlington, Texas. The Owls were predicted to finish tenth in the conference's preseason poll.

Roster

Schedule
Rice and Conference USA announced the 2022 football schedule on March 30, 2022.

Game summaries

at No.14 USC Trojans

vs. McNeese State

vs. Louisiana

at Houston (Bayou Bucket Classic)

UAB

at Florida Atlantic

at Louisiana Tech

Charlotte

UTEP

at Western Kentucky

UTSA

at North Texas

vs. Southern Miss (LendingTree Bowl)

References

Rice
Rice Owls football seasons
Rice Owls football